RTA Rapid Transit (generally known as The Rapid) is a rapid transit, light rail, and bus rapid transit system. The system is owned and operated by the Greater Cleveland Regional Transit Authority (GCRTA).

The system serves Cleveland and surrounding areas in Cuyahoga County. The system currently consists of seven total service lines: one rapid transit rail line; three light rail lines; and three bus rapid transit (BRT) lines.

Considered part of the rapid transit system, the bus lines are included on the official rapid transit map.

Rail Lines 
Four rail lines join at Tower City Center in downtown Cleveland, the former Cleveland Union Terminal.

Three rail lines share their tracks at Tri-C–Campus District and East 55th stations. This sharing of one route by light and heavy rail trains is quite unusual. The shared stations have connected platforms of two heights to accommodate the two kinds of trains. And the two types of trains both use the same maintenance facility since they both use the same track gauge and same source of power (overhead catenary).

Red Line 

The Red Line, a heavy-rail route, runs in both directions on fully grade-separated rights-of-way built from 1955 to 1968. It serves Cleveland's southwest suburbs, with its southwestern terminus at Cleveland Hopkins International Airport. Heading northeast, the Red Line serves University Circle before heading to its northeastern terminus at the Louis Stokes Station at Windermere in East Cleveland.

Blue, Green, and Waterfront Lines 

The Blue and Green light-rail lines (alternatively known as the RTA Shaker Rapid) were built from 1913 to 1936 as grade-separated lines closer to downtown and surface lines along street medians in the streetcar suburb of Shaker Heights.

The two lines part ways at Shaker Square, a historic mixed-use community in Cleveland proper, just west of the Shaker Heights border.
The Blue Line veers southeast along Van Aken Boulevard until reaching its terminus near the intersection of Warrensville Center Road and Chagrin Boulevard (U.S. Route 422 and State Route 8). The Green line continues due east along Shaker Boulevard (State Route 87) until reaching its terminus at the intersection of Green Road.

The Waterfront Line, opened in 1996, extends the Blue and Green Lines from Tower City north through The Flats. It then travels northeast along the shoreline of Lake Erie, servicing the local Amtrak station and terminates in the Muni lot. The Waterfront light rail line provides access from Tower City Center to the Flats, FirstEnergy Stadium, the Great Lakes Science Center, the Rock and Roll Hall of Fame, and Burke Lakefront Airport.

Rapid Transit Bus Lines

HealthLine 

In October 2008, RTA opened its first bus rapid-transit line. It runs along Euclid Avenue, providing a direct route between Cleveland's primary tourist attractions from Downtown Cleveland through University Circle to East Cleveland.

Originally referred to as the "Silver Line," naming rights for this RT bus line were bought by The Cleveland Clinic and University Hospitals, and the line was renamed the HealthLine.

Between Public Square and East 105th Street, the RT bus system includes dedicated bus lanes close to the inner median where light-rail stations are also located.

All RT bus stations along the route feature off-board fare collection. The RT buses include a GPS locator on board: the locator allows automated traffic signals to give the HealthLine buses priority at busy intersections.

The HealthLine runs 24 hours a day, 7 days per week.

Cleveland State Line 

In December 2014, RTA opened a second bus rapid transit to serve the western suburbs of Cleveland as well as a larger portion of downtown, including Cleveland State University. Cleveland State purchased naming rights to the route.  The line carries a "55" designation, the same bus route number used by the BRT's predecessor.

All passengers must pay or swipe/dip their farecards on board the bus.

Only a portion of the line along Clifton Boulevard–from the western terminus of Cleveland Memorial Shoreway to Webb Road in Lakewood– includes a dedicated bus-only lane.  However, the bus-only designation only applies during rush hours: with the eastbound bus-only lane active during the morning rush, and with the westbound bus-only lane active during the evening rush.

All outbound trips originate from the Stephanie Tubbs Jones Transit Center near Cleveland State and travel through downtown to Public Square before entering the west shoreway.  Shortly after reaching the Lakewood border, the line divides into three sub-routes:
 55: Travels down Clifton and continues to follow U.S. Route 20 to Detroit Road until reaching Wagar Road where it travels south to Lorain Rd in Fairview Park, continues to North Olmsted via Great Northern Mall before terminating near the Lorain County line. Rush hour trips travel into the North Olmsted park-n-ride.
 55B: Travels down Clifton and continues to follow Lake Road into Bay Village where it follows Wolf, West Oviatt, and Osborn Roads west to Bradley Road before returning to Lake Road to travel east to its terminus at Wolf and Cahoon Roads.
 55C: Travels down Clifton and continues to follow U.S. Route 20 to Detroit Road until reaching Crocker Road in Westlake where it terminates at Crocker Park.
The 55 base route runs 7 days a week from early A.M. though the evening.  The 55B and 55C routes run Monday through Friday during the morning and evening rush hours only. B and C also travel to the Westlake Park-n-Ride.

MetroHealth Line 

On Sept. 21, 2017, RTA announced a new partnership with the MetroHealth System to rebrand the number "51"  family of routes. On December 3, 2017, the rebranded MetroHealth Line began service with 20 new vehicles, fully branded with the MetroHealth logo. More than 400 bus-stop signs and 37 shelters also display the new logo along the routes. This service is essentially just a branding: other than new specially designed buses, no other BRT features are present.

All outbound trips originate at Rockwell Ave & E 3rd St, travel through Public Square and then south on W 25th St/Pearl Road until reaching Pearl Road & State Road, located just south of the MetroHealth South Campus. Here the route splits into two branches:

 51: Continues on Pearl Road, to the Parma Transit Center. With weekday daytime trips traveling via W 130th St and Tri-C Western Campus, and other trips via York Rd and W Ridgewood Drive. Buses can terminate early at the Southland Shopping Center.
 51A: Continues onto State Road, Pleasant Valley Road, and Ridge Road before ending at Parma Transit Center. Trips between 12:00am and 5:00am operate from the West 33rd St Loop.

Routes 51 and 51A run 7 days a week.

The 51A run 24 hours a day between downtown and the West 33rd Loop.  Weekdays the 51 and 51A run every 30 minutes south of the Pearl/State Rd split. Weekends the 51 and 51A run every 60 minutes.

Stations 

The RTA Rapid Transit system consists of a total of 47 stations. The stations are fully or partially within the city limits of Cleveland, Shaker Heights, East Cleveland, and Brook Park.

Note: Euclid–East 120th Street station closed in 2015 and was replaced by Little Italy–University Circle station.

See also 
 List of metro systems
 List of light rail transit systems
 List of rail transit systems in the United States
 List of Ohio train stations

References

External links 

Greater Cleveland Regional Transit Authority – Maps and Schedules

Jon Bell – Cleveland, Ohio: Transit Links
Cleveland, Ohio – Rapid Transit (RTA)
nycsubway.org – Cleveland, Ohio
RTA Rapid Transit Locations
Northern Ohio Railway Museum

 
Rapid transit in Ohio
Historic American Engineering Record in Ohio
Light rail in Ohio
Lists of metro stations

Passenger rail transportation in Ohio
Lists of Ohio railway stations